Simon Walter Stauffer (August 13, 1888 – September 26, 1975) was a United States representative from Pennsylvania.

Early life
S. Walter Stauffer was born in Walkersville, Maryland on August 13, 1888. He graduated from Dickinson College in Carlisle, Pennsylvania, in 1912.

Career
He moved to York, Pennsylvania in 1915. He was engaged in the manufacture of lime, crushed stone, and refractory dolomite from 1916 to 1936. He was a trustee of Dickinson College from 1930 until his death.

He served as president of the National Lime Association in Washington, D.C. from 1936 to 1946. He was chairman of York City Housing Authority from 1949 to 1952, and vice president and chairman of the executive committee of the York County Gas Co. from 1950 to 1960. He was also the owner of a large tract of woodland and engaged in timbering operations from 1947 to 1960.

Stauffer was elected as a Republican to the 83rd United States Congress, defeating incumbent Democratic Congressman James F. Lind, but was an unsuccessful candidate for reelection in 1954 against Democrat James M. Quigley. In a re-match against Congressman Quigley in 1956, he was elected to the 85th United States Congress, but was an unsuccessful candidate for reelection in 1958 against Quigley. Stauffer voted in favor of the Civil Rights Act of 1957.

Death
Stauffer died on September 26, 1975 in York. He was interred in Prospect Hill Cemetery.

References

The Political Graveyard

External links
National Lime Association
 

1888 births
1975 deaths
Politicians from York, Pennsylvania
People from Walkersville, Maryland
Republican Party members of the United States House of Representatives from Pennsylvania
20th-century American politicians